Cravero is an Italian surname. Notable people with the surname include:

Jorgelina Cravero (born 1982), Argentine tennis player
Philippe Cravero (born 1970), Swiss footballer
Roberto Cravero (born 1964), Italian footballer
Sergio Cravero, Italian engineer and businessman

Italian-language surnames